Downes Glacier is a broad tidewater glacier on the north side of Heard Island in the southern Indian Ocean. It flows north on both sides of Cape Bidlingmaier to the north coast of Heard Island. To the east of Downes Glacier is Ealey Glacier, whose terminus is located close southeast of Cape Bidlingmaier. To the west of Downes Glacier is Challenger Glacier, whose terminus is located at the eastern side of Corinthian Bay, close west to Saddle Point. Saddle Point separates Downes Glacier from Challenger Glacier.

Discovery and naming
Surveyed by ANARE (Australian National Antarctic Research Expeditions) in 1948. Named by Antarctic Names Committee of Australia (ANCA) for M.C. Downes, ANARE biologist at Heard Island in 1951 and 1963.

References

Further reading

External links
Click here to see a map of Heard Island and McDonald Islands, including all major topographical features
Australian Antarctic Division
Australian Antarctic Gazetteer
Composite Gazetteer of Antarctica
Australian Antarctic Names and Medals Committee (AANMC)
United States Geological Survey, Geographic Names Information System (GNIS)
Scientific Committee on Antarctic Research (SCAR)

Glaciers of Heard Island and McDonald Islands